Martin Kříž (born 17 June 1993) is a Czech professional basketball player for ERA Basketball Nymburk of the Czech Republic National Basketball League (NBL). He also represents the senior Czech Republic national team.

Professional career
During his pro career, Kříž has won ten Czech NBL national league championships, and eight Czech Cups.

National team career
Kříž represented the senior Czech national team at the 2016 Belgrade FIBA World Olympic Qualifying Tournament, the 2017 EuroBasket, and the 2019 FIBA World Cup.

References

External links
FIBA Profile
FIBA Europe Profile
EuroCup Profile
FIBA Champions League Profile
Eurobasket.com Profile

1993 births
Living people
2019 FIBA Basketball World Cup players
BK Pardubice players
Basketball Nymburk players
Centers (basketball)
Czech men's basketball players
Sportspeople from Pardubice
Power forwards (basketball)
USK Praha players